Old Waldorf was a music venue located in San Francisco, California. The famous club was located at 444 Battery St, and was originally opened by Jeffrey Pollack in 1976 before selling it to Bill Graham who closed it in 1983. During its time Old Waldorf hosted some of the biggest names in the music industry, such as Warren Zevon, AC/DC, Devo, Dire Straits, Blue Öyster Cult, Iggy Pop, Blondie, Rory Gallagher, Cheap Trick, Metallica, Pat Benatar, Journey, R.E.M., Television, Spirit, Poco, Afrika Bambaataa,  Gary Moore, U2 and Dead Kennedys.

The Punch Line comedy club now occupies part of Old Waldorf's location.

References

Former music venues in California
Music venues in the San Francisco Bay Area